Natural Compression was the first EP by the New Zealand rock band Weta, being released in 1999.

The EP received radio attention in New Zealand with the title track "Let It Go" becoming a staple of student and rock radio. Both "Let It Go" and "Got the Ju" would appear on the band's sole album, Geographica, in revised forms.

Track listing
"Let It Go"
"Got the Ju"
"Where Have You Been?"
"Updown"

Charts

References

1999 EPs
Weta (band) albums